Mala Mala is a 2014 Puerto Rican documentary film directed by Antonio Santini and Dan Sickles, starring Jason "April" Carrión, Samantha Close and Ivana Fred. The film shows several stories of the transgender community in Puerto Rico, including April Carrion, a well-known drag queen who participated in the reality show RuPaul's Drag Race. Mala Mala also includes the historic victory of the LGBT community with the approval and signature of Law 238-2014 (in Puerto Rico), which prevents discrimination in employment based on sexual orientation and/or gender identity. Mala Mala has been presented in festivals around the world, including London, Ukraine, Los Angeles, Austin, Costa Rica and Mexico, in addition to schools such as The Boston Conservatory at Berklee, University of Pennsylvania, New York University and Harvard University.

Cast
Jason Carrión as himself / as April Carrión
Samantha Close as herself
Ivana Fred as herself
Carlos Pascual as himself / as Queen Bee Ho
Paxx Moll as Themself
Alberic Prados as himself / as Zahara Montiere
Denise "Sandy" Rivera as herself
Soraya Santiago Solla as herself
Sophia Voines as herself

Critical reception
Critical reception for Mala Mala has been very positive. Writing for Out, Max McCormack describes that:Santini's and Sickles's style is as much a piece of modern investigation as it is a nod to films that came before. There are references to Paris is Burning, Pedro Almodóvar features, Valley of the Dolls, and even 90s Nickelodeon stylistic choices. The two men hope to make an impact in driving this notoriously ignored issue forward.In The Huffington Post, Priscilla Frank said that the film:shows a life in which the line between performance and reality fades away, where fantasy and fact contribute to one's reality. Mala Mala provides a thought-provoking look at where gender identity and cultural identity intersect, while showing that life still revolves around the search for selfhood and the love between friends.Frank Scheck from The Hollywood Reporter reviewed the film after their showcase at the Tribeca Film Festival:

The film examines the myriad personal issues of its interviewees who emerge as articulate spokespeople for their largely marginalized subculture. Sure to be a staple at gay-themed film festivals, the film should garner significant attention upon its commercial release. Its subjects are indeed a fascinating and diverse lot. Interspersed with the insightful interviews are glossily photographed scenes of the subjects clearly relishing playing to the camera, from Alberic sexily splashing about in his bathtub to Samantha bathing nude in a river to Sophia lip-synching a Barbra Streisand song using a dildo for a microphone.

Diana Clarke wrote for The Village Voice,In the Puerto Rican queer and drag communities, "mala" is used to mean something closer to "fierce." How rare and necessary to find a beautifully shot, kind and immersive movie that centers the stories and lives of brown transgender folks. This film does not pander. Rather, it demands that the viewer rise to the occasion.In December 2015 The Advocate published its list of "The 10 Best LGBT Documentaries of 2015" where Mala Mala figured as a favorite.

Awards and nominations

See also
 List of lesbian, gay, bisexual or transgender-related films of 2014

References

External links
 
 

2014 films
2014 documentary films
2014 LGBT-related films
American LGBT-related films
2010s Spanish-language films
LGBT in Puerto Rico
Puerto Rican films
Puerto Rican documentary films
Killer Films films
Transgender-related documentary films
2010s American films